The Woodrow was a British cyclecar manufactured in Stockport from 1913 to 1915. 

The 1913 cars were powered by a choice of water or air-cooled V twin engine of 964 cc made by JAP, with a three-speed gearbox and chain drive to a back axle that was unusually, for cyclecars of the time, fitted with a differential). 

In 1914 or possibly 1915 the engine was replaced by a larger 'Precision' V twin, water-cooled only, of 1090 cc made by F.E. Baker Ltd. 

A sports version was also made with a very long tapered bonnet. The cars were quite large by cyclecar standards, with a width of 48 inches (1219 mm) and length of 130 inches (3302 mm).

See also
 List of car manufacturers of the United Kingdom

References

Vintage vehicles
Cyclecars
Defunct motor vehicle manufacturers of England
History of the Metropolitan Borough of Stockport
Companies based in Stockport